Adrian Killins Jr. (born January 2, 1998) is an American football running back. He played college football at UCF. He played for the Philadelphia Eagles of the National Football League (NFL) and Arlington Renegades of the XFL.

Early life and high school
Killins was born and grew up in Daytona Beach, Florida and attended Mainland High School, where he played football and ran track. Killins was a two-time state champion in the 200 meters and was the runner-up in the 100 meters as a senior.

College career
Killins was a member of the UCF Knights for four seasons. He was named second-team All-American Athletic Conference (AAC) after his junior season when he rushed 147 times for 715 yards and eight touchdowns and had 19 receptions for 377 yards and four touchdowns. As a senior, Killins rushed for 629 yards and seven touchdowns and caught eight passes for 120 yards and one touchdown and was again named second-team All-AAC. Killins finished his collegiate career with 2,459 rushing yards and 25 rushing touchdowns.

Professional career

Philadelphia Eagles
Killins was signed by the Philadelphia Eagles as an undrafted free agent following the 2020 NFL Draft on April 25, 2020. He was waived on September 3, 2020, during final roster cuts, but re-signed to the team's practice squad three days later. He was promoted to the active roster on October 3, 2020. He was waived on October 5 and subsequently re-signed to the practice squad two days later. He was released from the practice squad on November 9, but re-signed to the practice squad again on November 17. He was released again on November 24, and re-signed to the practice squad again on December 11. He was placed on the practice squad/COVID-19 list by the team on January 2, 2021. His practice squad contract with the team expired after the season on January 11, 2021.

On March 17, 2021, Killins signed with the Eagles on a two-year contract. He was waived on August 14, 2021.

Denver Broncos
On August 17, 2021, Killins was signed by the Denver Broncos. He was waived/injured on August 24 and placed on injured reserve.

Houston Roughnecks 
On November 17, 2022, Killins was drafted by the Houston Roughnecks of the XFL. He was released on March 15, 2023.

References

External links
Philadelphia Eagles bio
UCF Knights bio

1998 births
Living people
Sportspeople from Daytona Beach, Florida
Players of American football from Florida
American football running backs
UCF Knights football players
Philadelphia Eagles players
Denver Broncos players
Houston Roughnecks players
Arlington Renegades players